Shock therapy describes a set of techniques used in psychiatry to treat depressive disorder or other illnesses, by inducing seizures or other extreme brain states. It was started in the 1930s.  Shock therapy covers multiple forms.  

The only form in current clinical practice is electroconvulsive therapy. Other forms, no longer in use, include:
Insulin shock therapy, introduced by Manfred Sakel in 1933 for the treatment of schizophrenia. This resulted in a coma state for a short amount of time.
Convulsive therapy, using pentylenetetrazol or other agents to induce seizures. The first use was with cardiazol by von Meduna of Budapest; the belief at the time was there was "some kind of biological antagonism between schizophrenia and epilepsy".
Deep sleep therapy.
Shock therapy has fallen away in use in lieu of other forms of treatment.

See also
 Shock therapy (disambiguation)

References

History of psychiatry
Physical psychiatric treatments